This list of African species extinct in the Holocene covers extinctions from the Holocene epoch, a geologic epoch that began about 11,650 years before present (about 9700 BCE) and continues to the present.  

Africa is highly biodiverse; it is the continent with the largest number of megafauna species, as it was least affected by the extinction of the Pleistocene megafauna. However, a few species have disappeared from Africa as part of the ongoing Holocene extinction, driven by human activity.  

Madagascar and the Indian Ocean islands, Macaronesia, and Saint Helena, Ascension and Tristan da Cunha are biogeographically distinct from mainland Africa, so recently extinct species from these regions are listed in separate articles.  

Many extinction dates are unknown due to a lack of relevant information.

Mammals (class Mammalia)

Undated

Prehistoric

Recent

Local

Birds (class Aves)

Undated

Prehistoric

Recent

Reptiles (class Reptilia)

Recent

Amphibians (class Amphibia)

Ray-finned fish (class Actinopterygii)

Insects (class Insecta)

Ostracods (class Ostracoda)

See also 
 List of Madagascar and Indian Ocean Island animals extinct in the Holocene
 List of Macaronesian animals extinct in the Holocene
 List of Saint Helena, Ascension and Tristan da Cunha animals extinct in the Holocene
 Lists of extinct species
 List of extinct bird species since 1500
 Extinct in the wild
 Lazarus taxon

Notes

References

External links 
 The Extinction Website
 IUCN Red List of Threatened Species

Africa
†Holocene